Betty Sue Flowers (b. February 2, 1947) is the former director of the Lyndon Baines Johnson Library and Museum (2002–2009) and an Emerita Professor of English at the University of Texas at Austin.

Flowers is a native Texan and graduated from the University of Texas (BA, 1969; MA, 1970) and the University of London (PhD, 1973). She is the author of a number of texts, particularly relating to Christina Rossetti.  She also edited the book and acted as a consultant to the 1988 documentary, The Power of Myth, a series of interviews between Joseph Campbell and Bill Moyers.

In the corporate world, Flowers has had a career as a veteran practitioner of scenario planning (a strategic foresight method) at Royal Dutch Shell. 

She also coauthored the influential book Presence: Human Purpose and the Field of the Future (2004) together with Peter M. Senge, C. Otto Scharmer and Joseph Jaworski - a predecessor to Theory U: Leading From The Future As It Emerges.

Personal
Flowers first marriage ended in 2005, with one son, John, who graduated from her alma mater in 2009, at which she delivered the commencement address.
She resigned from the LBJ Library that same summer and moved to New York to partner with former New Jersey Senator and NBA star Bill Bradley.

References

External links

Living people
Directors of museums in the United States
Women museum directors
University of Texas at Austin alumni
University of Texas at Austin faculty
People from Austin, Texas
Futurologists
American academics of English literature
Year of birth missing (living people)
Journalists from Texas